Triathlon at the 2007 Southeast Asian Games was held at the Pattaya, Chon Buri, Thailand

Medal winners

External links
Southeast Asian Games Official Website

2007 Southeast Asian Games events
Southeast Asian Games
2007